Arabs in Aspic, at times also Arabs in Aspic II, is a progressive rock band formed in 1997. They are considered an institution of Norwegian retro-prog.

History 
Formed in 1997 as a Black Sabbath cover band, Arabs in Aspic did not have a continuously cultivated name in their early days. Lead guitarist and vocalist Jostein Smeby played with Tommy Ingebrigtsen, who contributed as a rhythm guitarist and theremin player, in various cover bands with a focus on metal. To form the band, the duo enlisted Hammond organ player Magnar Krutvik and drummer Eskil Nyhus, as well as his brother, bassist Terje Nyhus. Due to the fact that Ingebrigtsen was popular as a world champion in ski jumping and the other founding members also practised the sport, the band was at times considered a ski jumping band; an attribution from which the band largely emancipated itself.

In the beginning, the group acted with various names. It wasn't until one gig that the name Arabs in Aspic was established. Out of affection for the King Crimson album Larks' Tongues in Aspic, the members tried to "put something else in 'Aspic'." By chance, the band discovered a book about cricket called Arabs in Aspic on eBay.

After the debut release, the group was joined by Stig Arve Jørgensen. He contributed background vocals and took over the Hammond organ after Krutvik switched to acoustic guitar and synthesiser. After the release of the album Far Out in Aradabia, the band's career ended for the time being.

In 2006, Smeby, Eskil Nyhus and Jørgensen joined forces with new bassist Erik Paulsen to form Arabs in Aspic II. Several demos were recorded in the following years until the band recorded the album Strange Frame of Mind in the studio of TNT guitarist Ronni LeTekro in 2009. Mastered by Tommy Hansen at Jailhouse Studios in Denmark, the album received critical acclaim and before its release as an LP in 2012, the band decided to drop the II in the band's name and once again operate as Arabs in Aspic. As of 2019, long-time live and session percussionist Alessandro Elide became a permanent member of Arabs in Aspic.

Style 
Smeby wrote most of the music from the beginning. In addition to Black Sabbath, he cited stoner rock and classical modernism as influences, while the other band members brought in influences from progressive rock, inspired by performers such as Genesis, King Crimson and Yes, as well as music of the Balkans, fusion, jazz and more. The different approaches form the musical foundation of the band.

As a result of their influences, the group combines "typical Scandinavian, slightly elegiac Retroprog with a good portion of hard rock." However, the band varied their style with the break in the band's history. While the first two releases leaned more towards hard rock and psychedelic rock, those after the group's reunion leaned more towards progressive rock.

With its closeness to Hawkwind, older Black Sabbath and Pink Floyd, the debut already corresponds to this style and combines "dark crushing guitars and a lot of Hammond organ". The influence of psychedelic rock is even more clearly served on the debut than on later releases.

On the subsequent, and a year later released, Far Out In Aradabia the style "was essentially continued. However, on Far Out In Aradabia the hard rock side of the band is emphasised more, the heavy guitar riffs crashing here even more often than on the debut." Also added was more independence and a more far-reaching creativity. Musically, the band remains connected to the 1970s, and Far Out In Aradabia is stylistically so close to Progeria in time that reviewers occasionally suspect "that both albums were recorded in one session."

With the reunion album Strange Frame of Mind, released in 2010, the group took a musical turn towards "likeable, perfectly old-fashioned" progressive rock, with "fat sound and impressive harmonies." Accordingly, Strange Frame of Mind was judged to be "the beginning of their modern era" in terms of the group's stylistic development. Without entirely discarding psychedelic rock, blues rock and hard rock influences to do so, the band increasingly embraced elements of progressive rock. Keyboard playing proved to be a prominent part of this change. The development is sometimes associated with the addition of Stig Arve Jørgensen. Other developments included an expansion of the distinct "developments include the increased prominence of backing vocals in more sophisticated arrangements and more frequent use of odd meters in the music." "Ironically," says Jon Davis, the loss of the second guitarist led to more variety in guitar playing, as Smeby used more different tones and techniques.

Reception 
Despite the change in style, international reviews of Arabs in Aspic's releases continued to be positive. Especially the re-releases and those after the reunion via Black Widow Records and Karisma Records received increased attention. The band is considered an "institution in its field".

The debut album Progeria, first released in 2003 via Børse Music, received international reviews, especially after its re-release via Karisma Records. The reviews of the remastered version of the album by Jacob Holm-Lupo were mostly positive. mastering version of the album were mostly positive. The release is "a short but nice combination of psychedelic retroprog and hard rock interludes", which however "still lacks the sophistication of the group's later albums", wrote Jochen Rinfrey for Babyblaue Seiten. On Metal Factory the album was praised as "[s]ehr interesting" for "70s and prog rock fans". A similar opinion was expressed for the webzine Vinyl-Keks. The album is for "prog rockers and fans of the 70s [...] a clear recommendation!" However, the debut was "not yet as musically mature" as subsequent releases. Mario Wolski from Saitenkult, on the other hand, criticised that the album "[was] much too short to pass as a full album."

Far Out In Aradabia follows the quality of its predecessor, but convinces with its humour. The humour and the improvised piece Butterpriest Jam led to a gradually better rating by Wolski from Saitenkult. The humour is also emphasised by Rinfrey for Babyblaue Seien. Norbert von Fransecky from Musikansich.de referred to the "messages recorded in German, which are completely weird numbers, both in terms of language and content." For Jon Davis of Exposé, the band also show more independence and creativity on the release. Meanwhile, the improvisation Butterpriest Jam divided the reviewers. While the track, which was only added for the re-release, was praised by some as "19 minutes of first-rate improv rock" and "real added value" the centrepiece and highlight of the release, others such as Eric Porter of Sea of Tranquility and Jon Davis of Exposé found it boring and tedious.

As the change in style ushered in by the reunion varied, so did the recommendations. Thus, Strange Frame of Mind was advised to those listeners who prefer progressive rock and appreciate Arabs in Aspic's more recent releases. In this new context, the music proves to be "obsolete, as the whole thing [...] sounds quite authentically like the 70s and also picks up the first retro-prog wave of the 90s [...]", but seems to be "very well" done, "technically perfectly implemented, [...] very colourful and imaginatively orchestrated and therefore all in all very varied."

The assessment of Picture in a Dream remained that the group had congruently dedicated themselves to the sound of the 1970s. At the same time, the album had, "of course, nothing new to offer at all", but was "full of charm and joy of playing". Steven Reid of Sea of Tranquility, meanwhile, saw the album as evidence of the band's ongoing qualitative improvement. All the tracks proved to be extremely skilfully recorded and provided with powerful harmonic vocals. Peter Hackett of Musicwaves, however, criticised these. He said that the many voices were not balanced and thus stifled the music, which had some excellent compositions.

Victim of Your Father's Agony also features the familiarity of the great and classic interpreters of progressive rock, but Arabs in Aspic take up the style and interpret it "new and fresh" in "their very own way." Jürgen Meurer of Betreutes Proggen also praised the album's reliably "good-humoured 70s-inspired prog" and only criticised the playing time of 38 minutes.  Contrary to speculations that the album was in constant play throughout, Henry Schneider of Exposé wrote that the album was "not a huge step ahead," yet it was "obvious that the band is evolving and maturing."

The seventh album of the band Syndenes Magi was praised by Thoralf Koß for Musikreviews.de as a "retro-progressive masterpiece from Norway, atmospherically moving between KING CRIMSON and PINK FLOYD". As a "musical nostalgia trip to the 70s that always evokes memories of big names from back then", and as a release "one of the most fascinating [LPs] of 2017" as well as a "consistently [... ] musical highlight" the reviewers of the webzines Babyblaue Seiten described the album. In addition to the toughness of the playing, which stood out from the models, the Norwegian vocals were highlighted, which gave the album its own touch.

On Magic and Madness, Andreas Schiffmann succeeded in condensing "everything that has always distinguished them into a comparatively 'thick' core". Thus, Arabs in Aspic "transfers the early phase of Genesis into the present time", which is why he declared the album "an abrasion-proof long-runner with addictive potential and a contender for the title 'Prog Record of the Year'". Other reviews were also full of praise, saying that the album was a "firework of ingenious ideas, of great songs performed with unbeatable nonchalance". Some criticisms were made, such as by Frank Jäger of Powermetal.de, about the production being too uniform. He speculated that an external producer could have brought out "a great album" even better. The album was repeatedly criticised for its lack of originality, as the band failed to "stand out from the self-made blueprint." On the other hand, the album was praised as such, as a successful example of retro-prog, "certainly leaving nothing to be desired by progressive music lovers". Especially "sympathisers of versatile retro-rock" would enjoy the album, because with Madness and Magic "Arabs in Aspic have once again succeeded in producing a beautiful retro-album," which is only nuances behind its predecessor, judged the reviewers of Babyblaue Seiten.

Discography 
Full Length
 2003: Progeria (Børse Music)
 2004: Far Out In Aradabia (Børse Music)
 2010: Strange Frame of Mind (Pancromatic)
 2013: Picture in a Dream (Black Widow Records)
 2015: Victim Of Your Father’s Agony (Black Widow Records)
 2017: Syndenes Magi (Apollon Records: PROG/Børse Music)
 2020: Madness & Magic (Album, Karisma Records)
Live
 2018: Live At Avantgarden (Apollon Records: PROG/Børse Music)
Compilations
 2011: Progeria / Far Out In Aradabia (Pancromatic)
 2021: I – III (Karisma Records/Børse Music)
Singles & EPs
 2015: Sad Without You/Italian Class/TV 3 (Crispin Glover Records)
 2015:  Prevail To Fail / Pictures In A Dream (feat. Rune Sundby, Crispin Glover Records)
 2018: De Dødes Tjern / Step Into The Fire (Apollon Records: PROG/Børse Music)

Members

Current members 
 Guitar, Vocals: Jostein Smeby
 Hammond, Background-Vocals: Stig Arve Jørgensen
 Drums: Eskil Nyhus
 Bass: Erik Paulsen
 Percussion: Alessandro Elide

Former Members 
 Guitar, Theremin: Tommy Ingebrigtsen
 Hammond, Acoustic-Guitar, Synthesizers: Magnar Krutvik
 Bass: Terje Nyhus

External links 
 Website

Einzelnachweise 

Norwegian progressive rock groups